Mark Indelicato (born July 16, 1994) is an American actor, singer, fashion blogger, and photographer best known for his role in the ABC comedy series Ugly Betty, as Justin Suarez, the fashion-obsessed nephew of series protagonist Betty Suarez.

Life and career
Indelicato was born in Philadelphia, the son of Lynn and Mark Indelicato, Sr. He is of three quarters Italian and one quarter Puerto Rican descent.  He was trained at The Actors Center in that city, and is a student at Dupree School of Music in Linwood, New Jersey. He began acting at age eight at Philadelphia's Walnut Street Theater, and has appeared in national television commercials, the CBS television series "Hacks", Chappelle's Show, and was a regular cast member of Ugly Betty on ABC until the series ended in 2010. He also attended the Professional Performing Arts School, before moving back to Los Angeles. He is attending New York University's Gallatin School of Individualized Study.

Indelicato was featured in an episode of the Disney Channel Original Series The Suite Life of Zack & Cody in a special High School Musical-themed episode.

On October 27, 2008, Indelicato performed the part of Boq for the "Wicked Day" 5th Anniversary Concert on Broadway in New York City as well. He performed again at the Gershwin Theatre on February 28, 2009 for the "Defying Inequality" benefit.

He starred as the Artful Dodger in the CLO production of Oliver! in Pittsburgh, PA.

He appeared on a special episode of Dr. Phil about teens who were being bullied after coming out. He shared his experience when he received numerous death threats and verbal abuse from people for his role on Ugly Betty.

Filmography

Film

TV

Web

References

External links

 Mark Indelicato's official fashion site.
 
 From Broadway World (August 21, 2007)
 BroadwayWorld.com interview with Mark Indelicato, October 21, 2008

American male child actors
American male film actors
American male television actors
Hispanic and Latino American male actors
American people of Puerto Rican descent
American people of Italian descent
Male actors from Philadelphia
1994 births
Living people
American gay actors
American gay musicians
New York University Gallatin School of Individualized Study alumni
LGBT Hispanic and Latino American people